Union Nationale (English: National Union) may refer to several political parties:

Union Nationale (Quebec), Canada
Rwandese National Union, Union nationale rwandaise in French
National Union (Chad), Union nationale in French
Chadian National Union, Union nationale tchadienne, known as UNT
National Union (Switzerland), Union nationale in French

See also
National Union (disambiguation), the English equivalent to this term

de:Union nationale
fr:Union nationale